Terry Spicer (born September 17, 1965) is an American politician who served in the Alabama House of Representatives from the 91st district from 1998 to 2010.

In 2010 Spicer pled guilty to accepting monthly bribes from gambling developer Ronnie Gilley and lobbyist Jarrod Massey. He was found guilty of accepting bribes, forced to resign his position, and sentenced to 57 months in prison.

References

1965 births
Living people
People from Opp, Alabama
Democratic Party members of the Alabama House of Representatives
20th-century American politicians
21st-century American politicians